László Lantos (4 December 1938 – 9 June 2019) was a Hungarian swimmer. He competed in three events at the 1960 Summer Olympics.

References

External links
 

1938 births
2019 deaths
Hungarian male swimmers
Olympic swimmers of Hungary
Swimmers at the 1960 Summer Olympics
People from Békéscsaba
Sportspeople from Békés County
20th-century Hungarian people
21st-century Hungarian people